William Bruce Hutchison,  (5 June 1901– 14 September 1992) was a Canadian writer and journalist.

Born in Prescott, Ontario, Canada, Hutchison was educated in public schools in Victoria, British Columbia. He married Dorothy Kidd McDiarmid in 1925, around the same time that he began his journalism career as a political reporter in Ottawa.  He was associate editor for The Winnipeg Free Press from 1944 to 1950.  Hutchison was also editor of the Victoria Daily Times from 1950 to 1963, for which he had previously worked as a high-school journalist in approximately 1918.  In 1963 Hutchison was made the editorial director to The Vancouver Sun.  Hutchison would write for The Vancouver Sun until his death in 1992.

He travelled extensively throughout Canada during his career, and was present at the Imperial Conference of 1937. He was widely considered one of Canada's foremost experts on politics and was known in Washington, D.C., as well as Ottawa. He wrote frequently on the subject of current affairs and politics, and also wrote short stories for The Saturday Evening Post, Collier's Weekly, Cosmopolitan, The American Magazine and Liberty.

Hutchison's first book, The Unknown Country, was published in 1942. Commissioned by a U.S. publisher with the intention of making America's new wartime ally better known to the American public, The Unknown Country was also published in Canada, and enjoyed favourable reviews on both sides of the border. It went on to win the 1942 Governor General's award for creative nonfiction.

In 1961, Hutchison was the first winner of the award from Distinguished Journalism in the Commonwealth, given by the Royal Society of Arts. In 1967 he was made an Officer of the Order of Canada.

The Jack Webster Foundation created the Bruce Hutchison Lifetime Achievement Award to recognize people making a lifetime of contribution to the field of journalism in British Columbia.

Awards
Bowater Prize - Details unknown, as reported in The Oxford Companion to Canadian Literature
Bruce Hutchison Lifetime Achievement Award - The Jack Webster Foundation - 1991 - First recipient; continued in Hutchison's name
City of Victoria Prize - 1990 - Details unknown, as reported in The Oxford Companion to Canadian Literature
Governor General's Literary Award - 1942 - For The Unknown Country
Governor General's Literary Award - 1952 - For The Incredible Canadian
Governor General's Literary Award - 1957 - For Canada: Tomorrow's Giant
Maclean's Honour Roll - 1989
National Newspaper Award - Canadian Newspaper Association - Editorial Writing - 1952
National Newspaper Award - Canadian Newspaper Association - Editorial Writing - 1957
National Newspaper Award - Canadian Newspaper Association - Staff Corresponding - 1959
Officer of the Order of Canada - Appointed 1967
Royal Society of Arts Award for Distinguished Journalism in the Commonwealth - 1961

Selected works
The Unknown Country: Canada and her People - 1942 (winner of a Governor General's Award) — Misinformed readers that Sons of Freedom are Doukhobors on pages 277, 285-286.
The Hollow Men - 1944
The Fraser - 1950
The Incredible Canadian: A candid portrait of Mackenzie King, his works, his times, and his nation - 1952 (winner of a Governor General's Award)
Canada's Lonely Neighbour - 1954
The Struggle for the Border - 1955
Canada: Tomorrow's Giant - 1957 (winner of a Governor General's Award)
Mr. Prime Minister 1867–1964 - 1964
Macdonald to Pearson: The prime ministers of Canada (Condensation of Mr. Prime Minister) - 1967 
Western Windows (Variant titles referenced; confirmed Western Windows in 1967 edition) - 1967
Canada: A year of the land - 1967
The Far Side of the Street - Autobiography - 1976
Uncle Percy's Wonderful Town - 1981
A Life in the Country - 1988

External links
 Bruce Hutchison Biography 
 The Oxford Companion to Canadian Literature entry on Bruce Hutchison (subscription required)
  Description of 2009 reissue of The Fraser

1901 births
1992 deaths
Journalists from Ontario
Officers of the Order of Canada
Governor General's Award-winning non-fiction writers
Vancouver Sun people